Viinijärvi is a lake in Northern Karelia region in Finland and the 36th largest lake in Finland. It is connected to the Vuoksi main catchment area. 

The municipalities of Polvijärvi, Outokumpu and Liperi are in the area.

See also
List of lakes in Finland

References

Lakes of Polvijärvi
Lakes of Liperi
Lakes of Outokumpu